WIRV (1550 AM) is a radio station  broadcasting an oldies format. Licensed to Irvine, Kentucky, United States, the station is owned by Kentucky River Broadcasting Co., Inc and features programming from ABC Radio.

1550 AM is a clear-channel frequency shared by Canada and Mexico.

References

External links
Cool Oldies V-99.3 Facebook

IRV
Estill County, Kentucky
1960 establishments in Kentucky
Radio stations established in 1960